Novogrudok District - a district (rajon) in the Grodno Region of Belarus.

The administrative center is Novogrudok.

Notable residents 

 Fabijan Abrantovič (1884,  Vieraskava village – 1946), religious and civic leader of the first half of the 20th century, victim of the Soviet repressions
 Uladzimir Konan (1934, Vieraskava village - 2011), Belarusian philosopher
 Michaś Naŭmovič (1922, Kašaliova village - 2004), French artist, member of the Rada of the Belarusian Democratic Republic
 Paval Navara (1927, Kupisk village - 1983), Belarusian émigré public figure and a co-founder of the Anglo-Belarusian Society
 Jazep Sažyč (1917, Haradzečna village – 2007), political figure, President of the Rada of the Belarusian Democratic Republic

References

 
Districts of Grodno Region